The 1919 Plymouth Sutton by-election was a parliamentary by-election held on 28 November 1919 for the British House of Commons constituency of Sutton in the city of Plymouth, Devon.

The seat had become vacant when the constituency's Conservative Member of Parliament (MP), Waldorf Astor, succeeded  the peerage as the second Viscount Astor on the death of his father on 18 October 1919.

Astor had held the seat since the 1918 general election, and its predecessor Plymouth since the December 1910 general election.

Candidates 
 The Conservative Party selected as its candidate Astor's wife Nancy, Lady Astor. She was also the candidate of the Coalition Government.
 The Asquithian Liberals stood Isaac Foot, who had served on Plymouth City Council and had previously contested Totnes and Bodmin.
 W. T. Gay stood for Labour, having done so in the 1918 election.  Thomas William Mercer again served as his agent.

Results 
Lady Astor retained the seat. She became the first woman to take up her seat in the Commons (the first woman to be elected, Countess Markievicz, the Sinn Féin MP for Dublin St Patrick's, refused to take her seat).

Votes

See also
 List of United Kingdom by-elections
 Plymouth Sutton constituency

References
 
 

Plymouth Sutton by-election
By-elections to the Parliament of the United Kingdom in Devon constituencies
Plymouth Sutton by-election
Elections in Plymouth, Devon
20th century in Plymouth, Devon
Plymouth Sutton by-election
1910s in Devon